Gerber may refer to:

Companies 
 Gerber Legendary Blades, a maker of consumer knives and tools headquartered in Oregon, USA
 Gerber Products Company, manufacturer of baby products in Michigan, USA
 Gerber Life Insurance Company, affiliated with Gerber Products
 Gerber Scientific, a company specializing in graphics and flexible material machinery in Connecticut, USA

Places

United States
 Gerber, California
 Gerber, Georgia, a ghost town
 Gerber/Hart Library and Archives in Chicago, Illinois, USA
 Gerber Scout Reservation, a summer camp for Boy Scouts, in Michigan, USA

People 
 Gerber (surname)
 Von Gerber

Other 
 Gerber convention, an ace-asking convention in contract bridge
 Gerber format, computer file format for fabricating printed circuit boards
 Gerber failure criterion, an engineering stress-life method of estimating a structural material's fatigue life

See also 
Gerbera, a type of daisy
Gerbert (disambiguation)
Geber (disambiguation)